Cahabón is a municipality in the Guatemalan department of Alta Verapaz. It is situated at 250m above sea level. It contains 31,425 people. It covers a terrain of 900km2. The annual festival is September 1-September 8.

Franja Transversal del Norte 

The Northern Transversal Strip was officially created during the government of General Carlos Arana Osorio in 1970, by Legislative Decree 60-70, for agricultural development. The decree literally said: "It is of public interest and national emergency, the establishment of Agrarian Development Zones in the area included within the municipalities: San Ana Huista, San Antonio Huista, Nentón, Jacaltenango, San Mateo Ixtatán, and Santa Cruz Barillas in Huehuetenango; Chajul and San Miguel Uspantán in Quiché; Cobán, Chisec, San Pedro Carchá, Lanquín, Senahú, Cahabón and Chahal, in Alta Verapaz and the entire department of Izabal."

Climate

Cahabón has a tropical climate (Köppen: Af).

Geographic location

See also

Franja Transversal del Norte

Notes and references

Bibliography

External links
Muni in Spanish

Municipalities of the Alta Verapaz Department